Konstantin Elias Kuhle (born 11 February 1989) is a German lawyer and politician of the Free Democratic Party (FDP) who has been serving as a member of the Bundestag from the state of Lower Saxony since 2017. Since 2023, he has been chairing the FDP in Lower Saxony.

Early life and career 
Kuhle grew up in Eilensen and attended the Paul-Gerhardt-School in Dassel. After a year abroad in Ecuador, he graduated from high school in 2008 and subsequently worked as a civilian servant in a project for assisted living at the German Red Cross in Einbeck. In 2009 he began studying law at the Bucerius Law School in Hamburg and at the Sciences Po in Paris, which he completed with the first state examination in 2014. From 2009 to 2014 he was a scholarship holder of the German National Academic Foundation.

After his legal clerkship at the Hanseatic Higher Regional Court in Hamburg, Kuhle successfully passed the second state examination in April 2017. He worked as a lawyer in Hannover.

Political career

Early beginnings 
Kuhle has been a member of the Young Liberals since 2002 and has been a member of the FDP since 2005. From 2014 until 2018, he served as chairman of the Young Liberals.

Member of the German Parliament, 2017–present
Kuhle became a member of the Bundestag in the 2017 German federal election.

In parliament, Kuhle was a member of the Committee on Internal Affairs and the Committee on European Affairs from 2018 to 2021. He also served as his parliamentary group's spokesman for domestic policy. Since 2022, he has been a member of the Parliamentary Oversight Panel (PKGr), which provides parliamentary oversight of Germany's intelligence services BND, BfV and MAD. That same year, he joined the Commission for the Reform of the Electoral Law and the Modernization of Parliamentary Work, co-chaired by Johannes Fechner and Nina Warken.

In addition to his committee assignments, Kuhle has been a member of the German delegation to the Parliamentary Assembly of the Council of Europe (PACE) since 2018. In the Assembly, he serves on the Committee on Culture, Science, Education and Media; the Sub-Committee on Integration; the Sub-Committee on Education, Youth and Sport; and the Sub-Committee on Refugee and Migrant Children and Young People. 

Kuhle is also part of a cross-party group in support of Schützenverein culture.

Since 2021, Kuhle has been serving as one of six deputy chairpersons of the FDP parliamentary group under the leadership of its chairman Christian Dürr.

Career in state politics 
From 2018 to 2023, Kuhle served as Secretary-General of the FDP in Lower Saxony, under the leadership of chairman Stefan Birkner. After the party's bad performance in the 2022 state elections, he succeeded Birkner.

Other activities 
 Islamkolleg Deutschland (IKD), Member of the Board (since 2021)

Political positions 
Amid the COVID-19 pandemic in Germany, Kuhle joined forces with five other parliamentarians – Gyde Jensen, Andrew Ullmann, Dieter Janecek, Kordula Schulz-Asche and Paula Piechotta – on a cross-party initiative in 2022 to support legislation that would require all those who have not had yet been vaccinated to receive counselling before later requiring all adults above 50 years to be vaccinated.

References

External links 

  
 Bundestag biography 
 

 

1989 births
Living people
Members of the Bundestag for Lower Saxony
Members of the Bundestag 2021–2025
Members of the Bundestag 2017–2021
Members of the Bundestag for the Free Democratic Party (Germany)
LGBT members of the Bundestag
Gay politicians